Amygdalea or Amygdalia may refer to several places in Greece:

Amygdalea, Achaea, a village in Paion, Achaea
Amygdalea, Arcadia, a village in Leonidio, Arcadia
Amigdalia, Lidoriki, a village in Lidoriki, Phocis regional unit
Amygdalia, Euboea, a village in Kafireas, Euboea
Amygdalea, Kozani, a village in the Kozani regional unit
Amygdalea, Larissa, a village in Koilada, Larissa regional unit